Central Lakes is an unincorporated community in Saint Louis County, Minnesota, United States.

The community is located 17 miles south of the city of Virginia at the junction of U.S. Highway 53 and Saint Louis County Road 93. Central Lakes is located 45 miles north of the city of Duluth.

Central Lakes is located between Cotton and Eveleth on Highway 53.

Anchor Lake, Augusta Lake, Central Lake, Elliott Lake, and Murphy Lake are in the vicinity.

The Anchor Lake Rest Area on Highway 53 is nearby.  Local business establishments include Porky's Building Supply.

References

 Rand McNally Road Atlas – 2007 edition – Minnesota entry
 Official State of Minnesota Highway Map – 2011/2012 edition

Unincorporated communities in Minnesota
Unincorporated communities in St. Louis County, Minnesota